A Master of Science in Nursing (MSN) is an advanced-level postgraduate degree for registered nurses and is considered an entry-level degree for nurse educators and managers. The degree also may prepare a nurse to seek a career as a nurse administrator, health policy expert, or clinical nurse leader. The MSN may be used as a prerequisite for doctorate-level nursing education, and used to be required to become an advanced practice registered nurse such as a nurse practitioner, clinical nurse specialist, nurse anesthetist, or nurse midwife.

This graduate-level degree may focus on one or more of many different advanced nursing specialties such as acute care, adult, family, gerontology, neonatology, palliative care, pediatric, psychiatric, or obstetrics and gynecological nursing.

More recently, universities have begun to offer Master of Science pre-registration nursing courses, which cover the registration process and nurse training of the undergraduate course, but with master's-level academic components. This course was initially started in the University of the West of Scotland in the UK, and has since been included in other universities.

See also
 Associate of Science in Nursing
 Bachelor of Science in Nursing
 Diploma in Nursing
 Doctor of Nursing Practice
 National League for Nursing Accrediting Commission
 Nurse education
 Nursing school

External links
CCNE - Commission on Collegiate Nursing Education - Accrediting body that "ensures the quality and integrity of baccalaureate and graduate education programs preparing effective nurses."
ACEN - Accreditation Commission for Nursing Education - Accrediting body that is "responsible for the specialized accreditation of nursing education programs."

Nursing
Nursing
Nursing degrees